Luigi Negri may refer to:

Luigi Negri (bassist) (1837–1891), Italian double bassist
Luigi Negri (bishop) (1941–2021), Archbishop of the Roman Catholic Archdiocese of Ferrara-Comacchio from 2012 to 2017
Luigi Negri (politician) (b. 1956), Italian politician for Lega Lombarda–Lega Nord